A.S.D. Jolly Montemurlo is an Italian football club based in Montemurlo, Tuscany. Currently it plays in Italy's Serie D.

History

Foundation
The club was founded in 1965.

Serie D
In the season 2012–13 the team was promoted for the first time, from Eccellenza Tuscany/A to Serie D.

Colours and badge
The team's colour is black.

Honours
Eccellenza:
Winner (1): 2012–13

References

External links
Official website 

Association football clubs established in 1965
Football clubs in Tuscany
Italian football clubs established in 1965
Montemurlo